First Asia Institute of Technology and Humanities is a Filipino educational supplier. The school offers pre-elementary, elementary, high school and college level education, offering courses in technology, humanities, and management. It offers two-year certificate programs under First Asia Community College.

The five-hectare campus has classrooms used for all levels of education. It houses facilities for sports, extra-curricular activities and school functions.

Degrees

School of Technology

 Bachelor of Science in Information Technology
 Bachelor of Science in Entertainment and Multimedia Computing
 Bachelor of Science in Computer Science
 Bachelor of Science in Industrial Engineering
 Bachelor of Science in Computer Engineering
 Bachelor of Science in Electronics Engineering (EcE)
 Bachelor of Science in Electrical Engineering

School of Management 

 Bachelor of Science in Accountancy
 Bachelor of Science in Accounting Technology
 Bachelor of Science in Management Accounting
 Bachelor of Science in Entrepreneurial Management
 Bachelor of Science in Hotel and Restaurant Management
 Bachelor of Science in Tourism

School of Humanities 

 Bachelor of Arts in Communication
 Bachelor of Arts in Multimedia Arts
 Bachelor of Science in Psychology
 Bachelor of Science in Mathematics
 Bachelor of Science in Nursing
 Bachelor of Science in Secondary Education (Math, English and Physical Education)
 Bachelor of Elementary Education
 Bachelor of Science in Criminology
 Bachelor of Science in Industrial Security Management

Schools in Batangas
Universities and colleges in Batangas
National Collegiate Athletic Association – South
Education in Tanauan, Batangas